The Red Light Bandit is a 1968 Brazilian crime film directed by Rogério Sganzerla, inspired by the crimes of the real-life burglar João Acácio Pereira da Costa, known as the "Red Light Bandit" (Bandido da Luz Vermelha). The film is a representative work of cinema marginal, the Brazilian underground filmmaking movement of the 1960s. Sganzerla was 21 years old when he directed it.

Sganzerla called the film a Third World western.

Plot

Jorge, a São Paulo house burglar, nicknamed by the press the "Red Light Bandit", baffles the police by using peculiar techniques. Always carrying a red flashlight, he rapes his victims,  has long dialogues with them and makes daring escapes.  Afterwards, he spends the profits of his crimes. The bandit's exploits are shown in a fragmented manner, voiced over by two narrators in the style of a sensationalistic radio program.

He has an affair with the femme fatale Janete Jane, meets other burglars and a corrupt politician, and gets betrayed. Pursued and cornered, he commits suicide.

Cast 

 Paulo Villaça as Jorge, the Red Light Bandit
 Helena Ignez as Janete Jane
 Luiz Linhares as police officer Cabeção
 Pagano Sobrinho as J.B. da Silva
 Roberto Luna as Lucho Gatica
 José Marinho as Tarzan
 Ezequiel Neves as Reporter
 Sérgio Mamberti as Homosexual
 Renato Consorte as TV host
 Sérgio Hingst as Millionaire
 Lola Brah as Rich Woman
 Antonio Lima as Gangster
 Ozualdo Candeias as Criminal
 Maurice Capovilla as Gangster
 Carlos Reichenbach as Gangster
 Sônia Braga as Victim

Reception

Film critic Ismail Xavier stated that the film treats the bandit's social milieu with irony, making use of collage, intertextuality and pastiche, in contrast with the Cinema Novo's naturalistic filmmaking.

In 2015, The Red Light Bandit was chosen by Abraccine as the sixth best Brazilian film of all time.

Awards and nominations
1968 Festival de Brasília  (Brazil)
 Best Costume
 Best Director
 Best Editing
 Best Film

Sequel
A sequel directed by Ícaro Martins and Helena Ignez, widow of Sganzerla, was released in 2010: Luz nas Trevas - A Volta do Bandido da Luz Vermelha.

References

External links 
 The Red Light Bandit on Enciclopédia Itaú Cultural (in Portuguese)
 
 

Crime films based on actual events
1960s Portuguese-language films
Brazilian crime films
1968 films
Films set in São Paulo
1960s crime films
Brazilian black-and-white films